Abinas Ruidas  is an Indian professional footballer who plays as a left winger for Madan Maharaj.

Career

East Bengal
Born in Budge Budge, West Bengal, Ruidas began his career with the youth sides at Mohun Bagan and Bhawanipore. He eventually joined I-League club East Bengal and played for the club in the Calcutta Football League where he impressed pundits and coaches as East Bengal won the state league. Despite his impressive performance in the Calcutta Football League, Ruidas was left out of the squad for the team's Federation Cup campaign.

Ruidas then made his professional debut on 18 January 2015 in East Bengal's first match of the I-League season against Sporting Goa. He started the match and played 72 minutes as East Bengal drew the match 1–1. He then scored his first professional goal for East Bengal in the team's next game against reigning I-League champions Bengaluru FC. His 53rd-minute strike at the Salt Lake Stadium was the sole goal in a 1–0 victory.

International
Abinash debuted for the India U23s against Uzbekistan U23s on 27 March 2015 in an AFC U-23 qualifier in Dhaka's Bangabandhu National Stadium.

Career statistics

Honours

Club
Mohun Bagan
Calcutta Football League (1): 2018–19

References

External links 
 East Bengal Football Club Profile

Living people
People from Budge Budge
Indian footballers
East Bengal Club players
Association football midfielders
Footballers from West Bengal
I-League players
India youth international footballers
1995 births
ATK (football club) players
Mumbai City FC players
Mohun Bagan AC players
TRAU FC players
RoundGlass Punjab FC players